Zela may refer to:

 Battle of Zela, a 47 BC battle between Julius Caesar and Pharnaces II of The Kingdom of Pontus
 Battle of Zela (67 BC), a battle in the Third Mithridatic War
 Pilodeudorix zela, a butterfly of family Lycaenidae
 Zela language, a minor Bantu language of the Democratic Republic of Congo
 Zela (skipper), a genus of grass skippers

Places 
Zela or Zelah, burial site of King Saul and his family in Israel
 Zela or Zile, a city and a district of Tokat Province, Turkey
 Zela (titular see), a Roman Catholic titular see
 Zela, West Virginia

People 
 Adrián Zela (born 1989), Peruvian footballer
 Amarildo Zela (born 1972), Albanian footballer
 Vaçe Zela (1939–2014), Albanian singer

See also 
 Francisco Antonio De Zela (1786–1821), Peruvian revolutionary
 Zella (disambiguation)